The Fresh Grocer is a supermarket chain based in Drexel Hill, Pennsylvania that operates thirteen stores in the Greater Philadelphia region of Pennsylvania. Founded in 1996 in Philadelphia, Pennsylvania, as an independent company, the company became a member of the Wakefern Food Corporation, a retailers' cooperative, in 2013.

History

The Fresh Grocer opened in 1996 in Philadelphia, Pennsylvania. The Fresh Grocer has locations on Walnut Street and Broad Street in North Philadelphia. On August 1, 2013, The Fresh Grocer became a member of Wakefern. One of the stores was converted to the ShopRite name while the others retained the Fresh Grocer name. The Fresh Grocer Location in Wilmington, DE was closed on December 9, 2019.

Expansion
Wakefern members Patrick Burns and Jeff Brown will open four new Fresh Grocer stores in March 2016, all in former Pathmark stores that were purchased at auction.  The stores will be opened in Wyncote, Upper Darby, Brookhaven, and Monument Avenue in Philadelphia.

Since 2001, the University of Pennsylvania made efforts to remove The Fresh Grocer from its Walnut Street location. In 2017, The Fresh Grocer was asked to vacate the property after failing to renew its lease. The grocery store sued University of Pennsylvania maintaining its intention to stay at the location.

In 2018, Governor of Pennsylvania, Tom Wolf spoke at The Fresh Grocer regarding boost pay in Pennsylvania allowing "hundreds of thousands of additional salaried employees eligible for overtime pay".

In 2019, Nicholas Markets, which previously operated as part of the Foodtown chain, joined the Wakefern cooperative, switching their stores to the Fresh Grocer banner, bringing the total stores under the banner to 13. In 2022, Gerrity's Supermarkets announced that they would be transitioning their 10 stores from the ShurSave banner to The Fresh Grocer banner, bringing the total stores under the banner to 23.

References 

Wakefern Food Corporation
American companies established in 1996
Retail companies established in 1996
Companies based in Middlesex County, New Jersey
Food and drink companies based in Philadelphia
Retailers' cooperatives in the United States
Supermarkets of the United States